The Battle of Sylhet ( Silet-er Juddho) was a major battle fought between the advancing Mitro Bahini and the Pakistani defences at Sylhet during the Bangladesh Liberation War. The battle took place 7 December and 15 December and was the Indian Army's first heliborne operation. It was a succession of the Battle of Gazipur in Kulaura. 

On the first landing in the outskirts of Sylhet, they met 31 Punjab, which promptly ran away, sporting the fear of the Gurkha Khukri from Atgram. Then they took off for Sylhet, and were met by heavy fire on landing. They forced the Gurkhas into a pocket, which they were unable to breach. Evacuations by Mi-4s continued all night, and an Alouette provided fire support.

But, by then, BBC sent out news that India had landed a 'Brigade', which incited fear in the enemy Garrison, whereas only a battalion was landed in Sylhet. This forced the Gorkhas to impersonate a Brigade. The continuing evacs at night convinced the enemy that the Gurkhas were being constantly reinforced.

Then, on December 16th, the whole enemy garrison of 8000 men surrendered to Brigade Commander 'Bunty' Quinn.

See also
 Timeline of the Bangladesh Liberation War
 Military plans of the Bangladesh Liberation War
 Mitro Bahini order of battle
 Pakistan Army order of battle, December 1971
 Evolution of Pakistan Eastern Command plan
 1971 Bangladesh genocide
 Operation Searchlight
 Indo-Pakistani wars and conflicts
 Meghna Heli Bridge

References

Battles of the Bangladesh Liberation War
Battles of Indo-Pakistani wars
1971 in India
December 1971 events in Asia
History of Sylhet